The Robertinida are an order of Middle Triassic to recent, benthic foraminifera in which tests are planispirally to trochospirally coiled, with chambers provided with an internal partition and hyaline  perforated walls composed of optically radiated aragonite.

References

 Alfred R. Loeblich Jr and Helen Tappan,1988. Forminiferal Genera and their Classification. Foraminifera-GSI
 Barun K. Sen Gupta 2002. Systematics of modern foraminifera. 

Foraminifera orders
Globothalamea